This is a timeline documenting events of Jazz in the year 1925.

Musicians born that year included Art Pepper and Zoot Sims.

Events

Standards

 In 1925 standards that were published included "Dinah" and "Squeeze Me".

Deaths

 January
 8 – Jimmy Palao, African-American Violinist, saxophonist, cornetist, mellophonist, and leader of the Original Creole Band (born 1879).

 June
 16 – Emmett Hardy, New Orleans American cornet player (born 1903).

 August
 16 – Edna Hicks, American singer (born 1895).

Births

 January
 6
 Jane Harvey, American singer (died 2013).
 Leon Abramson or Lee Abrams, American drummer (died 1992).
 7 – Dave Schildkraut, American saxophonist (died 1998).
 13 – Nat Peck, American trombonist (died 2015).
 19 – Don Lang, English trombonist and singer (died 1992).
 23 – Marty Paich, American pianist (died 1995).
 25 – Barbara Carroll, American pianist (died 2017).

 February
 4 – Jutta Hipp, German pianist and composer (died 2003).
 14 – Elliot Lawrence, American pianist and bandleader (died 2021).
 20 – Frank Isola, American drummer (died 2004).
 26 – Dave Pell, American saxophonist (died 2017).

 March
 5 – Jimmy Bryant, American guitarist (died 1980).
 13 – Roy Haynes, American drummer and band leader.
 14 – Sonny Cohn, American trumpeter (died 2006).
 21 – Harold Ashby, American saxophonist (died 2003).
 25 – Elmer Dresslar Jr., American singer (died 2005).
 26 – James Moody, American saxophonist (died 2010).

 April
 1 – Kathy Stobart, English saxophonist (died 2014).
 2 – Frank Holder, Guyanese singer and percussionist (died 2017).
 11 – Emil Mangelsdorff, German saxophonist.
 14 – Gene Ammons, American tenor saxophonist (died 1974).
 18 – Leo Parker, American saxophonist (died 1962).
 20 – Henri Renaud, French pianist (died 2002).
 21
 Carline Ray, American singer, pianist, and guitarist, International Sweethearts of Rhythm (died 2013).
 Sonny Berman, American trumpeter (died 1947).
 24 – Jiří Jirmal, Czech guitarist. (died 2019)
 26 – Jørgen Ingmann, Danish guitarist (died 2015).

 May
 5 – Sonny Parker, American singer and drummer (died 1957).
 9 – Eddie Preston, American trumpeter (died 2009).
 14 – Al Porcino, American trumpeter (died 2013).

 June
 6 – Al Grey, American trombonist (died 2000).
 23 – Sahib Shihab, American saxophonist (died 1989).
 26 – Ken Moule, English pianist, composer, and arranger (died 1986).
 29 – Hale Smith, American composer and pianist (died 2009).
 30 – Wallace Davenport, American trumpeter (died 2004).

 July
 16
 Cal Tjader, American vibraphonist and drummer (died 1982).
 Nat Pierce, American pianist (died 1992).
 17 – Jimmy Scott, American singer (died 2014).
 27 – Kippie Moeketsi, South-African alto saxophonist (died 1983).

 August
 3 – Dom Um Romão, Brazilian percussionist (died 2005).
 12 – Earl Coleman, American singer (died 1995).
 13 – Benny Bailey, American trumpeter (died 2005).
 15
 George Morrow, American bassist (died 1992).
 Oscar Peterson, Canadian pianist (died 2007).
 16
 Amru Sani, Indian-Jamaican singer and actor (died 2000).
 Mal Waldron, American pianist (died 2002).
 27 – Tony Crombie, English drummer and pianist (died 1999).

 September
 1 – Art Pepper, American saxophonist (died 1982).
 2 – Sherwood Johnson, American jazz patron (died 1998).
 13 – Mel Tormé, American singer (died 1999).
 16
 B.B. King, American guitarist (died 2015).
 Charlie Byrd, American guitarist (died 1999).
 18 – Pia Beck, Dutch pianist and singer (died 2009).
 22 – Russell Solomon, American entrepreneur, art collector, and founder of the Tower Records (died 2018).

 October
 2 – Phil Urso, American saxophonist (died 2008).
 3 – George Wein, American singer, pianist, and producer.
 5 – Bill Dixon, American trumpeter (died 2010).
 7 – Alvin Stoller, American drummer (died 1992).
 10 – Francisco Aguabella, Afro-Cuban percussionist (died 2010).
 15 – Mickey Baker, American guitarist (died 2012).
 18 – Boogie Woogie Red, American pianist (died 1992).
 25 – Zena Latto, American clarinetist and saxophonist (died 2016).
 29 – Zoot Sims, American saxophonist (died 1985).
 30
 Errol Parker, French-Algerian pianist (died 1998).
 Teo Macero, American saxophonist (died 2008).
 31 – Tommy Watt, Scottish bandleader (died 2006).

 November
 1 – Alonzo Levister, American pianist (died 2016).
 11 – Bruno Martino, Italian singer and pianist (died 2000).
 15 – Eddie Harvey, British pianist, trombonist, arranger, and educator (died 2012).
 16 – Nick Travis, American trumpeter (died 1964).
 20 – June Christy, American singer (died 1990).
 22 – Gunther Schuller, American hornist (died 2015).
 24 – Al Cohn, American saxophonist (died 1988).
 25 – Matthew Gee, American trombonist (died 1979).
 28 – Gigi Gryce, American saxophonist (died 1983).

 December
 1 – Dick Johnson, American clarinetist (died 2010).
 5 – Alvin Tyler, American saxophonist (died 1998).
 6 – Bob Cooper, American saxophonist (died 1993).
 8 – Sammy Davis Jr., American singer (died 1990).
 12 – Dodo Marmarosa, American jazz pianist (died 2002).
 15
 Billy Butler, American guitarist (died 1991).
 Jimmy Nottingham, American trumpeter (died 1978).
 23 – Janika Balázs, Serbian musician (died 1988).
 25 – Chris Woods, American saxophonist (died 1985).
 31 – Billy Taylor Jr., American upright bassist (died 1977).

 Unknown date
 Jim Aton, American bassist (died 2008).

References

Bibliography

External links
 History Of Jazz Timeline: 1925 at All About Jazz

Jazz, 1925 In
Jazz by year